
Year 845 (DCCCXLV) was a common year starting on Thursday (link will display the full calendar) of the Julian calendar.

Events 
 By place 
 Byzantine Empire 
 Byzantine–Arab War: A prisoner exchange occurs between the Byzantine Empire and the Abbasid Caliphate, at the River Lamos in Cilicia (modern Turkey). The exchanges last for 10 days, and the Byzantines recover 4,600 prisoners.

 Europe 
 March 28 or 29 (Easter) – Siege of Paris: Viking forces under the Norse chieftain Ragnar Lodbrok enter the River Seine, with a fleet of 120 longships (5,000 men). They pass through the city of Rouen and plunder the countryside. King Charles the Bald assembles an army and sends it to protect Paris, the capital of the West Frankish Kingdom. Ragnar routs the enemy forces, and hangs 111 of their prisoners in honour of Odin. Charles — to keep them from plundering his kingdom — pays a large tribute of 7,000 livres (pounds) of silver or gold, in exchange for their leaving. The Vikings also sack the cities of Hamburg and Melun.
 November 22 – Battle of Ballon: Frankish forces (3,000 men) led by Charles the Bald are defeated by Nominoe, count of Vannes, near Redon, Ille-et-Vilaine. After the battle, Brittany becomes a regnum 'kingdom' within the Frankish Empire.
 Viking forces destroy Hamburg.

 Asia 
 Great Anti-Buddhist Persecution: Emperor Wu Zong begins the persecution of Buddhists and other foreign religions in China, such as Zoroastrianism, Nestorian Christianity and Manichaeism. More than 4,600 monasteries, 40,000 temples and numerous shrines are destroyed. More than 260,000 Buddhist monks and nuns are forced to return to secular life.
 March 6 – 42 captured Byzantine officials from Amorium are executed at Samarra, then the capital of the Abbasid Caliphate, after repeated failed attempts to convert them to Islam.
 By topic 

 Religion 
 John Scotus Eriugena, Irish theologian, travels to France and takes over the Palatine Academy in Paris, at the invitation of Charles the Bald (approximate date).

Births 
 August 1 – Sugawara no Michizane, Japanese politician (d. 903)
 Árpád, Grand Prince of the Hungarians (approximate date)
 Berengar I, king of Italy (approximate date)
 Charles of Provence, Frankish king (d. 863)
 Liutgard of Saxony, Frankish queen (approximate date)
 Minamoto no Yoshiari, Japanese official (d. 897)
 Ricfried, Frankish nobleman (d. 950)
 Richilde of Provence, Frankish empress (approximate date)

Deaths 
 February 22 – Wang, empress and concubine of Mu Zong
 Abdallah ibn Tahir, Muslim governor (or 844)
 Abu Tammam, Muslim poet (b. 788)
 Bridei VII, king of the Picts
 Dionysius I, Syrian patriarch 
 Ecgred, bishop of Lindisfarne
 Eginhard, bishop of Utrecht
 Guerin, Frankish nobleman (or 856)
 Ibn Sa'd al-Baghdadi, Muslim historian (b. 784)
 Mislav, duke of Croatia (approximate date)
 Sahl ibn Bishr, Muslim astrologer (approximate date)
 Theophanes the Branded, Byzantine monk (b. 775)
 Turgesius, Viking chieftain (approximate date)

References

Sources